So Young is a mini-album by Australian blues, rock and R&B band Jo Jo Zep & The Falcons. Released in November 1978. The Album peaked at number 80 on the Australian Kent Music Report. "Soon You'll Be Gone" charted on the UK Indie Singles Charts at #35.

The group were angered by their record label EMI's decision to charge $5.99 for the record, rather than the $3.99 they had wished it to retail for. As a result, they left EMI and signed with Mushroom Records. The inclusion of a 'free album' in the first 5,000 copies of their next release, Screaming Targets, was to compensate fans who paid an album price for So Young.

Track listing

Charts

References 

1978 albums
Jo Jo Zep & The Falcons albums
Albums produced by Joe Camilleri